Al-Raqad syndrome is a congenital autosomal recessive syndrome discovered by Jordanian physician Mohammad Al-Raqad.
It is characterized by:
 Microcephaly
 Growth delay
 Psycho-motor developmental delay
 Congenital hypotonia.

Al-Raqad syndrome is caused by mutation of DCPS gene.

References

External links 
 NCBI
 MalaCards: The human disease database
 The Universal Protein Resource (UniProt)

Genetic diseases and disorders
Autosomal recessive disorders
Syndromes with microcephaly